Gip is an unincorporated community in Braxton County, West Virginia, United States. Gip's elevation is 932 feet and the community is located in the Eastern time zone.

The community's name is derived from shortening and alteration of the name of Frank Gibson, an early postmaster.

References

External links
 Map of Gip, West Virginia from Mapquest.com

Unincorporated communities in Braxton County, West Virginia
Unincorporated communities in West Virginia